Toward the Light is a 1920 ethical, philosophical and religious work by Michael Agerskov.

Toward(s) the Light may also refer to:

 Towards the Light (1918 film), a film directed by and starring Henry Edwards
 Towards the Light (1919 film), a Danish silent film 
 Towards the Light, a 2006 album by Patrick Hawes
 "Towards the Light", a song by The Boo Radleys from Everything's Alright Forever
 Towards the Light (song) , a single by Xu Weizhou